Antonio "Tonino" Guerra (16 March 1920 – 21 March 2012) was an Italian poet, writer and screenwriter who collaborated with some of the most prominent film directors in the world.

Life and work
Guerra was born in Santarcangelo di Romagna.
According to his obituary in The Guardian, Guerra first started writing poetry when interned in a prison camp in Germany, after being rounded up at the age of 22 with other antifascists from Santarcangelo. 

At 30 he moved to Rome and worked as a schoolteacher. During this time he met Elio Petri, the future director of Investigation of a Citizen Above Suspicion (1970), who worked as assistant to Giuseppe De Santis. Guerra was able to get his first screenwriting credit after he and Petri went to the Abruzzi mountains to find out about wolf-hunting; "Though they discovered that wolf hunters no longer existed, De Santis went ahead anyway with the film, Uomini e Lupi (Men and Wolves, 1957)".

Although a follower of Cesare Zavattini, who essentially defined the style and morals of Italian neorealism, Guerra deviated from his mentor: while Zavattini brought the directors with whom he collaborated over to his own social and moral speculation, Guerra went to the filmmakers and helped them advance their own concept. He worked with such filmmakers as Michelangelo Antonioni, in L'Avventura, La notte, L'Eclisse, The Red Desert, Blowup, Zabriskie Point and Identification of a Woman; Federico Fellini, in Amarcord; Theo Angelopoulos, in Landscapes in the Mist, Eternity and a Day and Trilogy: The Weeping Meadow; Andrei Tarkovsky, in Nostalghia; and Francesco Rosi, in The Mattei Affair, Lucky Luciano and Exquisite Corpses.

In 1990 Guerra in collaboration with Giovanni Urbinati to create the exhibition “La Cattedrale dove va a dormire il mare/The Cathedral where the sea goes to sleep”  at the deconsecrated church in Budrio near Bologna.

In 1995 he was awarded with an Honorable Diploma at the 19th Moscow International Film Festival.

He was an atheist.

Selected filmography

Writer

Actor
Er Più – storia d'amore e di coltello (1971)
Naissance d'un Golem (1991) - (uncredited)
Le Chien, le Général et les Oiseaux (2003) - Il generale (voice)

References

External links
 
 Tonino Guerra quote at Parajanov.com
 Dutch interview with Guerra in Filmkrant
 Tonino Guerra: The Poet of Italian Cinema

1920 births
2012 deaths
20th-century Italian male writers
20th-century Italian poets
People from the Province of Rimini
Foreign Members of the Russian Academy of Arts
Italian atheists
Italian male poets
Italian male screenwriters
Italian screenwriters
David di Donatello Career Award winners
David di Donatello winners
European Film Awards winners (people)
Parajanov Award winners
Cannes Film Festival Award for Best Screenplay winners